The Egg Harbor Township Nature Reserve is a 220-acre nature preserve located in Egg Harbor Township, New Jersey. The reserve features an arboretum, 6 miles of hiking trails and a lake used for fishing and kayaking.

The reserve is used for various events. In 2017, the reserve hosted their Turkey Trot 5k run and 1 miler walk.  It hosted a two day art exhibit in both 2016 and 2017.

References

External links 
www.ehtnaturereserve.org

Egg Harbor Township, New Jersey
Nature reserves in New Jersey
Protected areas of Atlantic County, New Jersey